Roberto Coraje Ábalos (born 16 August 1972) is an Argentine film and television actor. He has appeared in more than fifteen TV shows.

Biography 
He worked at the consulate of New York, in an area of “promoción de la Argentina como destino turístico y otras bondades” until 2001.

Personal life 
In 2007 he begins a relationship with the actress Mónica Antonópulos, with whom he had a son in 2012 named Camilo and from which he separated in 2013.

Career 
He debuted in 1992 on the show Jugate conmigo  presented and produced by Cris Morena. In cinema he acted in the movies Bacanal, In the year 1999. Then he acted in the telenovelas Quereme, La hermana mayor and 90 60 90 modelos, the latter was one of his greatest television hits playing the Natalia Oreiro gallant. He continued acting in fictions like RRDT, Son o se hacen and  Drácula and resumed his acting career in 2003 in Son amores. Later other characters arrived in Mosca & Smith, Soy tu fan and Champs 12. In 2007 he debuted in theater at work La extraña pareja, starring  Carlin Calvo and Pablo Rago. He made special participations in Ciega a citas, Herencia de amor, Un año para recordar, El hombre de tu vida, Historia clínica and Vecinos en guerra. In cinema he acted in the movies Noche de silencio insomne in 2011. In 2012 he acts in the series Babylon and the following year he integrates the cast of the Pol-ka telecomedy Solamente vos like heartthrob of María Eugenia Suárez.

Filmography

Television Programs

Television

Movies

Theater

References

External links

1972 births
Living people
People from Santiago del Estero
Argentine male film actors
Argentine male television actors